"Mean to Me" is the debut single of rock band Crowded House, released in 1986. The single was only released as a 7" vinyl, and was released two months prior to the group's self-titled debut album, Crowded House, on which the song appears. It peaked at No. 26 in Australia.

At the 1986 Countdown Australian Music Awards the song was nominated for Best Debut Single.

The song was often performed as the opening song for concerts, and it was most notably the first song performed at the group's final performance in 1996's Farewell to the World concert. It mentions in passing the town of Te Awamutu. The music video presents a longer intro showing the band enjoying themselves, and then playing the song in a warehouse. Repeatedly throughout the video, the band members continuously mouth "I love you" shown by the words in the video saying, "I LOVE YOU."

The song later appeared on Crowded House's greatest hits compilation Recurring Dream.

Composition
The lyrics largely concern an American Split Enz fan who had written to Finn's parents, hoping to meet him. Finn said, "The verse was written on a tour of New Zealand I did with Dave Dobbyn under the absolutely shocking moniker of the Party Boys. I met her and had 10 minutes with her. Then I came back later and she was dancing with Gary McCormick, so I wrote those lines in which I did intimate they'd got it on. She bailed me up in LA about three years later and was most upset. She swears she didn't. I felt chastened by that."

Reception
Junkee said, "The hangover of Split Enz is still present, most notably in the song’s wigged-out keyboard detour. What "Mean to Me" accomplishes outside of that, is establishing key touchstones of what will go on to be inextricable parts of the Crowded House sound. Both Finn’s strident pop sensibilities and his unique lyrical sense of place."

Track listing
Track 1 by Neil Finn. Track 2 by Finn and Eddie Rayner. Both tracks from the Crowded House album.
 "Mean to Me" - 3:17
 "Hole in the River" - 4:02

Charts

Notes

Crowded House songs
1986 debut singles
Songs written by Neil Finn
Song recordings produced by Mitchell Froom
Capitol Records singles
1986 songs